Borislav Georgiev (born 17 July 1974) is a former Bulgarian footballer. In his career he played as a defender and defensive midfielder.

Georgiev played for Sachsen Leipzig in Germany and for Kallithea F.C. and Levadiakos F.C. in the Greek Super League. In August 2011, he joined Etar 1924.

References

1974 births
Living people
Bulgarian footballers
Bulgarian expatriate footballers
PFC Spartak Varna players
FC Sachsen Leipzig players
FC Lokomotiv 1929 Sofia players
Levadiakos F.C. players
Kallithea F.C. players
PFC Slavia Sofia players
FC Etar 1924 Veliko Tarnovo players
First Professional Football League (Bulgaria) players
Super League Greece players
Expatriate footballers in Germany
Expatriate footballers in Greece
Bulgarian expatriate sportspeople in Greece
Association football defenders